In Freudian psychology, psychosexual development is a central element of the psychoanalytic sexual drive theory. Freud believed that personality developed through a series of childhood stages in which pleasure seeking energies from the child became focused on certain erogenous areas. An erogenous zone is characterized as an area of the body that is particularly sensitive to stimulation. The five psychosexual stages are the oral, the anal, the phallic, the latent, and the genital. The erogenous zone associated with each stage serves as a source of pleasure. Being unsatisfied at any particular stage can result in fixation. On the other hand, being satisfied can result in a healthy personality. Sigmund Freud proposed that if the child experienced frustration at any of the psychosexual developmental stages, they would experience anxiety that would persist into adulthood as a neurosis, a functional mental disorder.

Background 

Sigmund Freud (1856–1939) observed that during the predictable stages of early childhood development, the child's behavior is oriented towards certain parts of their body, e.g. the mouth during breast-feeding, the anus during toilet-training. He argued that adult neurosis (functional mental disorder) often is rooted in childhood sexuality, and consequently suggested that neurotic adult behaviors are manifestations of childhood sexual fantasy and desire. That is because human beings are born "polymorphous perverse", infants can derive sexual pleasure from any part of their bodies, and that socialization directs the instinctual libidinal drives into adult heterosexuality. Given the predictable timeline of childhood behavior, he proposed "libido development" as a model of normal childhood sexual development, wherein the child progresses through five psychosexual stagesthe oral; the anal; the phallic; the latent; and the genitalin which the source pleasure is in a different erogenous zone.

Freudian psychosexual development 

Sexual infantilism: in pursuing and satisfying their libido (sexual drive), the child might experience failure (parental and societal disapproval) and thus might associate anxiety with the given erogenous zone. To avoid anxiety, the child becomes fixated, preoccupied with the psychologic themes related to the erogenous zone in question. The fixation persists into adulthood and underlies the personality and psychopathology of the individual. It may manifest as mental ailments such as neurosis, hysteria, "female hysteria", or personality disorder.

Oral stage

The first stage of psychosexual development is the oral stage, spanning from birth until the age of one year, wherein the infant's mouth is the focus of libidinal gratification derived from the pleasure of feeding at the mother's breast, and from the oral exploration of their environment, i.e. the tendency to place objects in the mouth. The id dominates, because neither the ego nor the super ego is yet fully developed, and, since the infant has no personality (identity), every action is based upon the pleasure principle. Nonetheless, the infantile ego is forming during the oral stage; two factors contribute to its formation: (i) in developing a body image, they are discrete from the external world, e.g. the child understands pain when it is applied to their body, thus identifying the physical boundaries between body and environment; (ii) experiencing delayed gratification leads to understanding that specific behaviors satisfy some needs, e.g. crying gratifies certain needs.

Weaning is the key experience in the infant's oral stage of psychosexual development, their first feeling of loss consequent to losing the physical intimacy of feeding at mother's breast. Yet, weaning increases the infant's self-awareness that they do not control the environment, and thus learns of delayed gratification, which leads to the formation of the capacities for independence (awareness of the limits of the self) and trust (behaviors leading to gratification). Yet, thwarting of the oral-stage – too much or too little gratification of desire – might lead to an oral-stage fixation, characterized by passivity, gullibility, immaturity, unrealistic optimism, which is manifested in a manipulative personality consequent to ego malformation. In the case of too much gratification, the child does not learn that they do not control the environment, and that gratification is not always immediate, thereby forming an immature personality. In the case of too little gratification, the infant might become passive upon learning that gratification is not forthcoming, despite having produced the gratifying behavior.

Anal stage

The second stage of psychosexual development is the anal stage, spanning from the age of eighteen months to three years, wherein the infant's erogenous zone changes from the mouth (the upper digestive tract) to the anus (the lower digestive tract), while the ego formation continues. Toilet training is the child's key anal-stage experience, occurring at about the age of two years, and results in conflict between the id (demanding immediate gratification) and the ego (demanding delayed gratification) in eliminating bodily wastes, and handling related activities (e.g. manipulating excrement, coping with parental demands). The style of parenting influences the resolution of the id–ego conflict, which can be either gradual and psychologically uneventful, or which can be sudden and psychologically traumatic.

The ideal resolution of the id–ego conflict is in the child's adjusting to moderate parental demands that teach the value and importance of physical cleanliness and environmental order, thus producing a self-controlled adult. Yet, if the parents make immoderate demands of the child, by overemphasizing toilet training, it might lead to the development of a compulsive personality, a person too concerned with neatness and order. If the child obeys the id, and the parents yield, they might develop a self-indulgent personality characterized by personal slovenliness and environmental disorder. If the parents respond to that, the child must comply, but might develop a weak sense of self, because it was the parents' will, and not the child's ego, which controlled the toilet training.

Phallic stage

The third stage of psychosexual development is the phallic stage, spanning the ages of three to six years, wherein the child's genitalia are their primary erogenous zone. It is in this third infantile development stage that children become aware of their bodies, the bodies of other children, and the bodies of their parents; they gratify physical curiosity by undressing and exploring each other and their genitals, and so learn the physical (sexual) differences between male and female and their associated social roles. In the phallic stage, a boy's decisive psychosexual experience is the Oedipus complex, his son–father competition  for possession of mother. This psychological complex derives from the 5th-century BC Greek mythologic character Oedipus, who unwittingly killed his father, Laius, and sexually possessed his mother, Jocasta. Analogously, in the phallic stage, a girl's decisive psychosexual experience is the Electra complex, her daughter–mother competition  for psychosexual possession of father. This psychological complex derives from the 5th-century BC Greek mythologic character Electra, who plotted matricidal revenge with Orestes, her brother, against Clytemnestra, their mother, and Aegisthus, their stepfather, for their murder of Agamemnon, their father, (cf. Electra, by Sophocles).

Initially, Freud equally applied the Oedipus complex to the psychosexual development of boys and girls, but later developed the female aspects of the theory as the feminine Oedipus attitude and the negative Oedipus complex; yet, it was his student–collaborator, Carl Jung, who coined the term Electra complex in 1913. Nonetheless, Freud rejected Jung's term as psychoanalytically inaccurate: "that what we have said about the Oedipus complex applies with complete strictness to the male child only, and that we are right in rejecting the term 'Electra complex', which seeks to emphasize the analogy between the attitude of the two sexes".

Oedipus: Despite mother being the parent who primarily gratifies the child's desires, the child begins forming a discrete sexual identity – "boy", "girl" – that alters the dynamics of the parent and child relationship; the parents become the focus of infantile libidinal energy. The boy focuses his libido (sexual desire) upon his mother, and focuses jealousy and emotional rivalry against his father – because it is he who sleeps with mother. To facilitate uniting him with his mother, the boy's id wants to kill father (as did Oedipus), but the ego, pragmatically based upon the reality principle, knows that the father is the stronger of the two males competing to possess the one female. Nevertheless, the boy remains ambivalent about his father's place in the family, which is manifested as fear of castration by the physically greater father; the fear is an irrational, subconscious manifestation of the infantile Id.

Electra: Whereas boys develop castration anxiety, girls develop penis envy that is rooted in anatomic fact: without a penis, she cannot sexually possess mother, as the infantile id demands. As a result, the girl redirects her desire for sexual union upon father; thus, she progresses towards heterosexual femininity that culminates in bearing a child who replaces the absent penis. Moreover, after the phallic stage, the girl's psychosexual development includes transferring her primary erogenous zone from the infantile clitoris to the adult vagina. Freud thus considered a girl's Oedipal conflict to be more emotionally intense than that of a boy, potentially resulting in a submissive woman of insecure personality.

Psychologist Karen Horney has disputed this theory, calling it inaccurate and demeaning to women. She proposed that, in fact men experience feelings of inferiority because they cannot give birth to children, a concept she referred to as womb envy.

Psychologic defense: In both sexes, defense mechanisms provide transitory resolutions of the conflict between the drives of the Id and the drives of the ego. The first defense mechanism is repression, the blocking of memories, emotional impulses, and ideas from the conscious mind; yet it does not resolve the id–ego conflict. The second defense mechanism is Identification, by which the child incorporates, to their ego, the personality characteristics of the same-sex parent; in so adapting, the boy diminishes his castration anxiety, because his likeness to father protects him from father's wrath as a rival for mother; by so adapting, the girl facilitates identifying with mother, who understands that, in being females, neither of them possesses a penis, and thus they are not antagonists.

Dénouement: Unresolved psychosexual competition for the opposite-sex parent might produce a phallic-stage fixation leading a girl to become a woman who continually strives to dominate men (viz. penis envy), either as an unusually seductive woman (high self-esteem) or as an unusually submissive woman (low self-esteem). In a boy, a phallic-stage fixation might lead him to become an aggressive, over-ambitious, vain man. Therefore, the satisfactory parental handling and resolution of the Oedipus complex and of the Electra complex are most important in developing the infantile super-ego, because, by identifying with a parent, the child internalizes morality, thereby, choosing to comply with societal rules, rather than having to reflexively comply in fear of punishment.

Latency stage

The fourth stage of psychosexual development is the latency stage that spans from the age of six years until puberty, wherein the child consolidates the character habits they developed in the three earlier stages of psychologic and sexual development. Whether or not the child has successfully resolved the Oedipal conflict, the instinctual drives of the child are inaccessible to the ego, because their defense mechanisms repressed them during the phallic stage. Hence, because said drives are latent (hidden) and gratification is delayed – unlike during the preceding oral, anal, and phallic stages – the child must derive the pleasure of gratification from secondary process-thinking that directs the libidinal drives towards external activities, such as schooling, friendships, hobbies, etc. Any neuroses established during the fourth, latent stage, of psychosexual development might derive from the inadequate resolution either of the Oedipus conflict or of the ego's failure to direct their energies towards socially acceptable activities.

Genital stage

The fifth stage of psychosexual development is the genital stage that spans puberty through adult life, and thus represents most of a person's life; its purpose is the psychological detachment and independence from the parents. The genital stage affords the person the ability to confront and resolve their remaining psychosexual childhood conflicts. As in the phallic stage, the genital stage is centered upon the genitalia, but the sexuality is consensual and adult, rather than solitary and infantile. The psychological difference between the phallic and genital stages is that the ego is established in the latter; the person's concern shifts from primary-drive gratification (instinct) to applying secondary process-thinking to gratify desire symbolically and intellectually by means of friendships, a love relationship, family and adult responsibility.

Criticisms

Scientific
A usual criticism of the scientific (experimental) validity of the Freudian psychology theory of human psychosexual development is that Sigmund Freud was personally fixated upon human sexuality; therefore, he favored defining human development with a normative theory of psychologic and sexual development. The phallic stage proved more complex, as it drew on clinical observations that Freud interpreted as supporting the Oedipus complex.

In Analysis of a Phobia in a Five-year-old Boy (1909), Freud presented a case study of the boy "Little Hans" (Herbert Graf, 1903–73) who had a fear of horses, as well as fear of his father. Freud posited that these two fears were related, and derived from both external factors such as the birth of his sister, and internal factors like an Oedipal desire to replace father as companion to mother, as well as guilt for enjoying the masturbation normal to a boy of his age. Hans expressed a wish to procreate with mother, which Freud considered proof that he desired her sexually. Hans did not, however, see a connection between his fears, and it was Freud who concluded that they both resulted from Hans feeling intimidated by the presence of a penis much larger than his own. Freud further stated that "Hans had to be told many things that he could not say himself," and that "he had to be presented with thoughts, which he had, so far, shown no signs of possessing".

Freud also stated that his patients commonly had memories and fantasies of childhood seduction. Many critics hold that these were much more likely to have been constructs which Freud created and forced upon his patients. According to Frederick Crews, the seduction theory that Freud abandoned in the late 1890s acted as a precedent to the wave of false allegations of childhood sexual abuse in the 1980s and 1990s.

Feminist

Contemporaneously, Sigmund Freud's psychosexual development theory is criticized as sexist and phallocentric, because it was informed with his introspection (self-analysis). To integrate the female libido (sexual desire) to psychosexual development, he proposed that girls develop "penis envy". In response, the German Neo-Freudian psychoanalyst Karen Horney, counter-proposed that girls instead develop "Power envy", rather than penis envy. She further proposed the concept of "womb and vagina envy", the male's envy of the female ability to bear children; yet, contemporary formulations further develop said envy from the biologic (child-bearing) to the psychologic (nurturance), envy of women's perceived right to be the kind parent.

Anthropologic

Contemporary criticism also questions the universality of the Freudian theory of personality (id, ego, super-ego) discussed in the essay On Narcissism (1914), wherein he said that "it is impossible to suppose that a unity, comparable to the ego can exist in the individual from the very start". Contemporary cultural considerations have questioned the normative presumptions of the Freudian psychodynamic perspective that posits the son–father conflict of the Oedipal complex as universal and essential to human psychologic development.

The anthropologist Bronisław Malinowski's studies of the Trobriand islanders challenged the Freudian proposal that psychosexual development (e.g. the Oedipus complex) was universal. He reported that in the insular matriarchal society of the Trobriand, boys are disciplined by their maternal uncles, not their fathers (impartial, avuncular discipline). In Sex and Repression in Savage Society (1927), Malinowski reported that boys dreamed of feared uncles, not of beloved fathers, thus, power – not sexual jealousy – is the source of Oedipal conflict in such non–Western societies. In Human Behavior in Global Perspective: an Introduction to Cross-Cultural Psychology (1999), Marshall H. Segall et al. propose that Freud based the theory of psychosexual development upon a misinterpretation. Furthermore, contemporary research confirms that although personality traits corresponding to the oral stage, the anal stage, the phallic stage, the latent stage, and the genital stage are observable, they remain undetermined as fixed stages of childhood, and as adult personality traits derived from childhood.

See also

References 

Developmental stage theories
Freudian psychology